Saymasay (Saimasai), formerly Aleksandrovka, is a village in Almaty Region of south-eastern Kazakhstan.

Notable residents
Yakov Rylsky (born 1928), Soviet Olympic and world champion sabre fencer

External links
Tageo.com

Populated places in Almaty Region